Dr. Dolittle: Million Dollar Mutts (also known as Dr. Dolittle 5) is a 2009 American comedy film directed by Alex Zamm and starring Kyla Pratt and Norm Macdonald. It was released on May 19, 2009, and like its predecessor, Dr. Dolittle: Tail to the Chief (2008), was a direct-to-DVD release.

It is the fifth and final film in the Dr. Dolittle film series, before the 2020 reboot and is the final Dr. Dolittle film to be distributed by 20th Century Fox, and the third film in the series not to feature Eddie Murphy as Doctor Dolittle or Raven-Symoné as Charisse Dolittle, though they are mentioned in the film. Pratt and MacDonald are the only cast members to appear in all five films.

Plot
Maya Dolittle (Kyla Pratt) thinks she doesn't have to spend 7 years in college to be a vet because she can talk to animals. While taking a walk with Lucky (voiced by Norm MacDonald), she helps a cat on a tree by talking to it. She gets discovered and Tiffany Monaco (Tegan Moss), a Hollywood star, brings her to L.A. to help her little puppy, who turns out to be a male. Soon, Maya and Tiffany began creating their own show, The Animal Talkers. Maya also meets Brandon Booker (Brandon Jay McLaren) who is her love interest. Maya soon finds out the show isn't about helping animals and goes back home to study being a vet. She also finds out Brandon is at her school too. Meanwhile, Monkey (voiced by Phil Proctor) is out in L.A. searching for his big break but quits because he wants to help Maya.

Cast
 Kyla Pratt as Maya Dolittle
 Tegan Moss as Tiffany Monaco
 Brandon Jay McLaren as Brandon Booker
 Jason Bryden as Rick Beverley
 Karen Holness as Lisa Dolittle
 Judge Reinhold as Network Executive
 Sebastian Spence as Chad Cassidy
 Elizabeth Thai as Reporter
 Frank Cassini as Firefighter
 Sarah Deakins as Vet
 Mark Hillson as Biker
 Doron Bell as Ridiculuz
 Curtis Caravaggio as Chase
 Matthew Harrison as Paul Furhooven

Voice cast
 Norm Macdonald as Lucky the Dog
 Jaime Ray Newman as Emmy
 Phil Proctor as Monkey/Snake
 Greg Ellis as Dave the Dove
 Fred Stoller as Fluffernufferman
 Pauly Shore as Cat
 Jeff Bennett as Princess / Rocco / Frog / Horse
 Vicki Lewis as Chubster
 Stephen Root as Turtle
 Greg Proops as Puppy

References

External links
 

2009 films
2009 direct-to-video films
20th Century Fox direct-to-video films
American children's comedy films
Canadian children's comedy films
2000s English-language films
Davis Entertainment films
Direct-to-video comedy films
Doctor Dolittle films
American fantasy comedy films
Film spin-offs
Films produced by John Davis
Films directed by Alex Zamm
Direct-to-video sequel films
2000s American films
2000s Canadian films